Chhota Laukuthi is a census town in the Tufanganj II CD block in the Tufanganj subdivision of the Cooch Behar district  in the state of West Bengal, India.

Geography

Location

Bakshirhat is not identified in 2011 census as a separate inhabited place but the place has a post office and a police station by that name. Census maps do not show Bakshirhat police station, but it is mentioned in Cooch Behar police records. Google maps show both Chhota Laukuthi and Bakshirhat as adjacent places.

Area overview
The map alongside shows the eastern part of the district. In Tufanganj subdivision 6.97% of the population lives in the urban areas and 93.02% lives in the rural areas. In Dinhata subdivision 5.98% of the population lives in the urban areas and 94.02% lives in the urban areas. The entire district forms the flat alluvial flood plains of mighty rivers.

Note: The map alongside presents some of the notable locations in the subdivisions. All places marked in the map are linked in the larger full screen map.

Civic administration

CD block HQ
The headquarters of the Tufanganj II CD block are located at Chhota Laukuthi.

Demographics
As per the 2011 Census of India, Chhota Laukuthi had a total population of 5,480.  There were 2,791 (51%) males and 2,689 (49%) females. There were 622 persons in the age range of 0 to 6 years. The total number of literate people in Chhota Laukuthi was 3,986 (82.05% of the population over 6 years).

Infrastructure
According to the District Census Handbook 2011, Koch Bihar, Chota Laukuthi covered an area of 0.6863 km2. Among the civic amenities, it had 33 km roads with open drains, the protected water supply involved tank/pond/lake, hand pumps. It had 450 electric connections, 40 electric light points. Among the medical facilities the nearest dispensary/ health centre was 3 km away, it had 4 medicine shops in the town. Among the educational facilities it had 2  primary schools, 3 middle schools, 1 high school, 1 higher secondary school.

References

Cities and towns in Cooch Behar district